Jan Shejbal (born 20 April 1994) is a professional Czech football player who currently plays for Bohemians 1905.

References

External links
 
 

1994 births
Living people
Place of birth missing (living people)
Czech footballers
Czech expatriate footballers
Czech Republic youth international footballers
Czech Republic under-21 international footballers
Association football midfielders
FK Pardubice players
FC Hradec Králové players
FC Nitra players
FK Teplice players
Czech First League players
Czech National Football League players
2. Liga (Slovakia) players
Expatriate footballers in Slovakia
Czech expatriate sportspeople in Slovakia
Sportspeople from Pardubice
Bohemians 1905 players